Charles C. Campbell is an American voice actor, ADR director and recording engineer for ADV Films/Seraphim Digital and Funimation/Okatron 5000. He provides voices for a number of English-language dubs of Japanese anime films.

Career
Campbell was employed as ADV Films' first in-house ADR audio engineer. He sat behind the mixing board through many ADV classics, including Neon Genesis Evangelion, Blue Seed, Battle Angel, Golden Boy and even the live action giant monster classic Gamera: Guardian of the Universe. He moved to Austin in 1998 to open ADV's Monster Island Studios. His directorial and writing debut was in 2000's Lost Universe. After directing the dub of Korean "live action" hit No Blood, No Tears in 2004, he was transferred back to ADV Studios in Houston. There he directed and produced the 105-episode Science Ninja Team Gatchaman dub.

In addition to writing and directing, Campbell has been a voice actor in many ADV titles. In recent years Charlie has been working at Funimation as a voice actor and occasional director in shows like One Piece, and Kenichi: The Mightiest Disciple. He also recently directed the Rurouni Kenshin: New Kyoto Arc and the Gatchaman OVA for Sentai Filmworks in 2013.

Filmography

Anime dubbing

 009-1 - Karl
 Aesthetica of a Rogue Hero - Volk Rem Aleclaster IV
 Air - Unsui
 Air Gear - Murata, Sunao
 Akame ga Kill! - Assistant Instructor (Ep. 3), Old Man (Ep. 9), Eyes (Ep. 11)
 Appleseed XIII - Lance
 Baka and Test - Summon the Beasts 2 - Obata (Ep. 2)
 Bamboo Blade - Morita, Toraji's Father
 Black Butler II - Arnold Trancy (Ep. 1), Earl Trancy (Ep. 8)
 Blood Reign: Curse of the Yoma - Marou (2nd Demon Form), Spider Demon
 Bodacious Space Pirates - Stone
 D. Gray-man - Mana Walker, Pedro, Charles (Ep. 1)
 Darker Than Black - Soichi Isozaki
 Deadman Wonderland - Akiyama, Ekishi (Ep. 12)
 The Devil Is a Part-Timer! - Watanabe
 Dimension W - Atsushi Kageyama (Ep. 4), Shijuro Sakaki (Ep. 3)
 Dragon Ball Z: Resurrection 'F' - Staff A
 Dragon Ball Z Kai - North Supreme Kai
 Dragon Ball Super - Pell, Vewon, Minotaurus
 Eureka Seven: AO - Alexander Boyle
 Fire Emblem - Barst, Gharnef
 Fairy Tail - Wakaba Mine, Wakaba (Edolas), Shop Owner (Ep. 1), Edolas Shop Owner (Ep. 80)
 Fullmetal Alchemist: Brotherhood - Giolio Comanche
 Ga-rei Zero - Yu Isayama
 Ghost Hunt - Kazuyasu Yoshimi
 Golden Boy - Narrator
 Guilty Crown - Shuichiro Keido
 Guyver: The Bioboosted Armor - Dr. Hamilcar Baracus, Additional Voices
 Hero Tales - Sōei
 ID: Invaded - Takuhiko Hayaseura/Uraido
 Innocent Venus - Katsura
 Jing: King of Bandits: Seventh Heaven - Wayward Angel
 Kaze no Stigma - Hellhound, Sakamoto
 Kiba - Zico
 Last Exile: Fam, the Silver Wing - Gilbert (Ep. 20)
 Love After World Domination - Professor Big Gelato
 Michiko and Hatchin - Pogo (Ep. 8), Tito Ducha (Ep. 20)
 Moonlight Mile - Chris Jefferson, Lt. Mike Brian, Steve O'Brien
 My Hero Academia - Gran Torino
 Ninja Resurrection - Senpachi Iso
 Oh! Edo Rocket - Santa
 One Piece (Funimation dub) - Carne, Zenny, Corgi, Banban, Fujitora, Additional Voices
 Panty & Stocking with Garterbelt - Police Chief (Ep. 1A), Additional Voices
 Princess Jellyfish - Kouichi Koibuchi
 Prison School - Chairman Kurihara
 Project Blue Earth SOS - Dr. Odenworld Jeeves, Alien Voice
 Psycho-Pass - Toyoshisa Senguji (Ep. 8-11)
 Pumpkin Scissors - Narrator, Smokey
 Red Garden - Robert Meyer
 RIN ~Daughters of Mnemosyne~ - Ivan
 Rurouni Kenshin - New Kyoto Arc - Kurojo
 Sakura Wars (OVA 2) - Shigeki Kanzaki
 Samurai X: Reflection - Ujiki
 Scarlet Nexus - Joe Sumeragi
 Science Ninja Team Gatchaman - Leader X, Additional Voices (ADV dub)
 Sgt. Frog - Viper (2nd voice)
 Shakugan no Shana - Quetzalcoatl (Seasons 2-3), Centerhill, Gavida, Louie, Ose (Season 3)
 Shangri-La - Old Man Loli
 Shigurui: Death Frenzy - Henyasai Tanaba
 Shiki - Yoshikazu Tanaka
 Sonic the Hedgehog: The Movie - Old Man Owl
 Soul Eater - Lupin (Ep. 3)
 Space Dandy - Additional Voices
 Spice and Wolf - Jacob
 Tekken: The Motion Picture - Thug 1 
 That Time I Got Reincarnated as a Slime  - Hakuro
 Tokyo Majin - Munetaka Yagyu
 Toriko - Morton
 The Tower of Druaga - King Gilgamesh
 Unbreakable Machine-Doll - Edward Rutherford
 Utawarerumono - Genjimaru
 Wedding Peach - Akira Tamano
 Xenosaga: The Animation - Cpt. Moriyama
 Yuri on Ice - Toshiya Katsuki
 Zone of the Enders - Ron Pao, Temujin

Video Games
 Borderlands 2 - Various
 DC Universe Online - Kilowog
 Smite - Ymir Is Here

Production Staff

Dubbing Director
 009-1
 Blade of the Phantom Master
 City Hunter: The Secret Service
 Comic Party Revolution
 Devil Lady
 Final Fantasy: Unlimited
 Gatchaman
 Getter Robo: Armageddon
 Guyver: The Bioboosted Armor
 Jing: King of Bandits
 Kenichi: The Mightiest Disciple
 Moeyo Ken
 Lost Universe
 Nadia: The Secret of Blue Water
 New Fist of the North Star
 One Piece (Funimation dub)
 Project Blue Earth SOS
 Pumpkin Scissors
 Rurouni Kenshin: New Kyoto Arc
 Sakura Diaries (2000 original version)
 Sakura Wars (OVAs)
 Samurai X
 Science Ninja Team Gatchaman
 Steam Detectives
 Zone of the Enders

Recording Engineer
 801 T.T.S. Airbats
 The Adventures of Kotetsu
 Battle Angel
 Black Lion
 Blue Seed
 Burn-Up W
 City Hunter: .357 Magnum
 City Hunter: Bay City Wars
 City Hunter: Goodbye My Sweetheart
 City Hunter: Million Dollar Conspiracy
 City Hunter: The Secret Service
 Debutante Detective Corps
 Devil Hunter Yohko
 Devil Lady
 Dirty Pair Flash (OVA 1)
 Dragoon
 Ellcia
 Fire Emblem (anime)
 Getter Robo: Armageddon
 Golden Boy
 Iczelion
 Jing, King of Bandits
 Kimera
 Legend of Crystania 
 Lost Universe
 Maps
 Mazinkaiser
 Moeyo Ken TV
 My Dear Marie
 Nadia: The Secret of Blue Water
 Neon Genesis Evangelion
 New Fist of the North Star
 Ninja Resurrection
 Plastic Little
 Queen Emeraldas
 Rail of the Star
 Samurai X (OVAs)
 Sakura Wars (OVAs)
 Shattered Angels
 Shuten-Doji: The Star-Hand Kid
 Sol Bianca
 Sonic the Hedgehog: The Movie
 Suikoden Demon Century
 Tekken: The Motion Picture
 Variable Geo
 The Wallflower
 Zone of the Enders

Script Adaptation
 City Hunter: The Secret Service
 Guyver: The Bio-boosted Armor
 Lost Universe
 Project Blue Earth SOS
 Science Ninja Team Gatchaman

Dubbing Producer
 City Hunter: The Secret Service
 Devil Lady
 Final Fantasy: Unlimited
 Getter Robo: Armageddon
 Jing, King of Bandits
 Lost Universe
 Mazinkaiser
 Moeyo Ken (OVAs)
 Nadia: The Secret of Blue Water
 New Fist of the Star
 Project Blue Earth SOS
 Sakura Wars (OVA 2)
 Samurai X (OVAs)
 Science Ninja Team Gatchaman
 Soul Hunter
 Steam Detectives
 Zone of the Enders

References

External links
 
 
Official Myspace page

Living people
American audio engineers
American male video game actors
American male voice actors
Male actors from Houston
American voice directors
20th-century American male actors
21st-century American male actors
Year of birth missing (living people)
Place of birth missing (living people)